The Men's 2005 European Union Amateur Boxing Championships were held in Cagliari, Sardinia, Italy from June 4 to June 11. The 3rd edition of the annual competition was organised by the European governing body for amateur boxing, EABA. A total number of 92 fighters from across Europe competed at these championships.

Medal winners

External links
EABA Boxing

References

European Union Amateur Boxing Championships
European Union Amateur Boxing Championships
Boxing Championships
Boxing Championships
European Union Amateur Boxing Championships